Cool Blue is a 1989 American romantic comedy film directed by Mark Mullin and Richard Shepard, and stars Woody Harrelson, Hank Azaria, Ely Pouget and Sean Penn.

Plot 
An aspiring painter named Dustin Pennett is on a search for love, sex, and inspiration when he meets a woman named Christiane at an art gallery. They spend the night together at her apartment, but the next morning she has disappeared, leaving Dustin heartbroken. He visits her family home in Southern California and learns from her younger sister that Christiane ran away at a young age after having an abortion, also finding out that "Christiane's" apartment was actually a display room she had broken them into.

Dustin returns home to Los Angeles and, after confiding in Phil, a plumber who has seen Dustin at his local pub, about his issues with Christiane, finds success painting portraits of her from memory, idealizing her as his true love. Dustin's best friend, a struggling writer named Buzz, envies his friend's newfound success. After Dustin easily beds Cathy, a woman Buzz has been chasing for two years, Buzz angrily shouts at Dustin and threatens him with a pool cue during a drunken argument.

Christiane returns to the gallery and finds Dustin's paintings of her, including a nude one which she slashes. She then breaks into his apartment and throws blue paint on him. Christiane says that they had a meaningless encounter and complains that the paintings are interfering with her life. Dustin responds that he painted them because their night together meant something to him and he wants to get to know her as a person.

After making up with Buzz, Dustin ditches a show planned for him in New York by his manager Paul in order to meet Christiane at the Los Angeles County Museum of Art. The film ends with a shot of Dustin and Christiane embracing.

Cast 

Woody Harrelson as Dustin
Hank Azaria as Buzz
Ely Pouget as Christiane
Paul Lussier as Paul
Phillip Brock as Bruce
Judie Aronson as Cathy
Christopher McDonald as Peter Sin
Gloria LeRoy as Ida
Karen Haber as Sascha
Jonathan Chapin as Les
Cindy Guyer as Girl in Gallery
Elisabeth Mullin as Rebecca
Allison Robinson as Cindy
Brian Ruf as Bartender
Nicoletta Munroe as Anna
John Diehl as Clayton
Julie Friedman
Sean Penn as Phil the Plumber (uncredited)

Home media 
Filmed in mid-1988 in Los Angeles, Cool Blue was picked up for domestic distribution by RCA-Columbia and Epic Home Video in late 1989. It was first released in the US on February 27, 1990, on pay-per-view and cable TV. On March 7, it was released in the US on VHS and LaserDisc, however it was first released in Greece on VHS in September 1989. In 1991, the film was released on VHS in Australia and the UK.

It was not released on DVD until March 13, 2012, when MGM Home Entertainment released a remastered widescreen version as part of their Limited Edition Collection, with a trailer as the only special feature.

References

External links 
 

1989 romantic comedy films
American romantic comedy films
Films about fictional painters
Films set in California
Films set in Los Angeles
1989 directorial debut films
1989 films
Films directed by Richard Shepard
1990s English-language films
1980s English-language films
1980s American films
1990s American films